Tom Pearson (born 26 October 1999) is an English rugby union player for London Irish in Premiership Rugby, his preferred position is back row.

Early life
Pearson began playing rugby at 6 years old at his local rugby club in Bromyard, Herefordshire, before going on to play for Luctonians, also in Herefordshire.  Pearson went to Dean Close School and Cardiff Metropolitan University where he played 1XI. Pearson played 42 times for the university across both the local Welsh league and the BUCS Super Rugby competition.

Career
Pearson signed for London Irish on 21 June 2021. Pearson made his debut for Irish away to Exeter Chiefs on 23 October 2021, and was named as Player of the Match in an Irish win.

On 8 February 2022 Pearson was called up to train with  during the 2022 Six Nations Championship, and scored his first try for Irish as they beat Bristol on 11 February 2022.

Personal life
Tom attended a boarding school in Cheltenham, Gloucestershire from Year 9 with his brother Will Pearson, who also plays for Luctonians. He was in Tower House and also played 1XI Cricket.

References

1999 births
Living people
English rugby union players
London Irish players
Rugby union flankers